John Searles is an American writer and book critic. He is the author of four novels: Her Last Affair (ISBN-10: 0060779659 ), Help For The Haunted, Strange But True and Boy Still Missing. His essays have appeared in national magazines and newspapers, and he contributes frequently to morning television shows as a book critic.  He is based in New York City.

Life
Born and raised in New England, Searles is the son of a truck driver and stay-at-home mother. After high school, Searles worked at the DuPont factory close to his hometown   He went on to pursue an undergraduate degree from Southern Connecticut State University, becoming the first member of his family to attend college, before entering a graduate program at New York University  where he won a number of fiction awards and received a Master of Fine Arts degree in creative writing.

Career
After completing his master's degree, Searles took a job at Redbook magazine reading fiction submissions.  He soon moved on to a part-time job in the books department at Cosmopolitan, where he went on to hold many positions including Books Editor, Executive Editor, Editorial Brand Director and Editor-at-Large.

Upon the 2001 publication of Searles’ first novel, Boy Still Missing, Time named him a “Person to Watch”   His second novel, Strange But True, was named the best novel of 2004 by Salon.com.  Searles’ novel Help for the Haunted, published by William Morrow/HarperCollins  and was hailed by author Gillian Flynn as “dazzling… a novel both frightening and beautiful."

His essays have appeared in The Washington Post, the New York Times, and other national magazines and newspapers. He has featured frequently as a book critic on morning television shows including NBC's Today Show, CBS’s The Early Show, Live! With Regis and Kelly,  and CNN to discuss his favorite book selections.

In 2019, a film adaptation of Strange But True was released by Lionsgate and CBS Films.

References

Living people
Year of birth missing (living people)
21st-century American male writers
21st-century American non-fiction writers
21st-century American novelists
American magazine editors
American male non-fiction writers
American male novelists
New York University alumni
People from Monroe, Connecticut
Southern Connecticut State University alumni